Saint Lydia may refer to:

Lydia of Thyatira, first recorded convert to Christianity in Europe
 See Philetus (martyr), for Lydia, 2nd-century Illyrian Christian martyr